Twelve Miles Out is a 1927 American silent drama film directed by Jack Conway and starring John Gilbert and Joan Crawford. It is based on the 1925 Broadway play Twelve Miles Out by William Anthony McGuire.

Plot
Jerry Fay is a bootlegger who expropriates the home of society girl, Jane, for his illicit activities. While as his captor, Jane slowly begins to fall for Jerry.

Cast
 John Gilbert as Jerry Fay
 Ernest Torrence as Red McCue
 Joan Crawford as Jane
 Eileen Percy as Maizie
 Paulette Duval as Trini
 Dorothy Sebastian as Chiquita
 Gwen Lee as Hulda
 Edward Earle as John Burton
 Bert Roach as Luke

References

External links

Twelve Miles Out at SilentEra
 

1927 films
1927 drama films
American black-and-white films
Silent American drama films
American films based on plays
American silent feature films
Films about the United States Coast Guard
Films directed by Jack Conway
Films produced by Irving Thalberg
Metro-Goldwyn-Mayer films
1920s American films
Silent adventure films